Byram is an English toponymic surname, a variant spelling of Byron, derived from Byram, North Yorkshire. Notable people with the surname include:

 Abram Robertson Byram (c. 1825 – 1893), English-Australian mayor
 Amanda Byram (born 1973), Irish television host
 Amick Byram (born 1955), American Gospel Singer and tenor
 Bowen Byram (born 2001), Canadian ice hockey player
 Gavin Byram (born 1974), English cricketer
 Sam Byram (born 1993), English footballer
 Shawn Byram (born 1968), Canadian ice hockey player

See also 
 
 
 Biram (disambiguation), a variant spelling
 Biron (surname), a variant spelling
 Byrom, a variant spelling
 Byrum (surname), a variant spelling

References 

English-language surnames
English toponymic surnames